The Israel women's national 3x3 team is a national basketball team of Israel, administered by the Israel Basketball Association. It represents the country in international women's 3x3 (3 against 3) basketball competitions.

World Cup record

See also
Israel women's national basketball team
Israel men's national 3x3 team

References

External links

Women's national 3x3 basketball teams
B